Thornhurst Addition is a national historic district located at Carmel, Hamilton County, Indiana.   It encompasses 21 contributing buildings and 1 contributing site in a predominantly residential section of Carmel. It developed between about 1956 and 1971, and includes notable examples of Modern Movement style architecture designed by Avriel Shull (1931-1976).  It includes homes of post and beam construction with huge aluminium window expanses, slate or stone entry floors, and clerestory windows.

It was listed on the National Register of Historic Places in 2010.

References

Historic districts on the National Register of Historic Places in Indiana
Houses on the National Register of Historic Places in Indiana
Modernist architecture in Indiana
Historic districts in Hamilton County, Indiana
National Register of Historic Places in Hamilton County, Indiana